VA-42 or VA 42 may refer to:

Attack Squadron 42, an aviation unit of the United States Navy
Virginia State Route 42, a road in the Commonwealth of Virginia, USA